Mackinac Trail, or Mackinaw Trail is the name for two related, but separate, roadways in the US state of Michigan. 

In the Upper Peninsula:
, previous designation of H-63, before the construction of the I-75 freeway
, the entire road between St. Ignace and Sault Ste. Marie
In the Lower Peninsula:
, between Petoskey and I-75 south of Mackinaw City
Old , between Reed City and Petoskey.

County roads in Michigan
Historic trails and roads in Michigan